Sean Reeves (born 23 May 1961) is a New Zealand sailor. He competed in the 470 event at the 1984 Summer Olympics.

References

External links
 

1961 births
Living people
New Zealand male sailors (sport)
Olympic sailors of New Zealand
Sailors at the 1984 Summer Olympics – 470
Sportspeople from New Plymouth